This is a list of patrol boats of the Royal Navy.

Active
  patrol and training craft
 Archer
 Biter
 Smiter
 Pursuer
 Blazer
 Dasher
 Puncher
 Charger
 Ranger
 Trumpeter
 Tracker
 Raider
 Express
 Example
 Explorer
 Exploit
  offshore patrol craft
 Tyne 
 Severn
 Mersey 
 Forth
 Medway
 Trent
 Tamar
 Spey

Former

  Gibraltar patrol craft
 Scimitar
 Sabre
  offshore patrol craft
 
 MTB 102 motor torpedo boat
  interchangeable motor gunboat / torpedo boats 
  - launched 20 August 1952
  - launched 20 August 1952
  - launched 19 December 1952
  - launched 19 December 1952
  - launched 22 January 1953
 - launched 23 January 1953
  - launched 3 September 1952
  - launched 12 January 1953
  - launched 12 June 1953
  - launched 28 January 1953
  - launched 18 February 1953
  - launched 23 March 1954
  interchangeable motor gunboat / torpedo boats
  - launched 28 October 1954
  - launched 9 December 1954
  - launched 11 December 1954
  - launched 6 September 1955
  - launched 23 June 1955
  - launched 30 September 1954
  - launched 9 February 1955
  - launched 4 October 1955
  - launched 5 December 1956
  - launched 16 March 1957
  - launched 29 March 1955
  - launched 18 March 1954
  - launched 16 May 1957
  - launched 6 July 1955
  - launched 5 September 1955
  - launched 26 September 1956
  - launched 30 August 1954
  - launched 20 March 1958
 Harbour Defence Motor Launch designed for harbour defence but used in general escort and patrol roles.
  seaward defence boats
 
 
 
 
 
 
 
 
 
 
 
 
 
 
 
 
 
 
 
 
  experimental gas-turbine powered attack craft
  (1951) - scrapped 1962
  (1951) - scrapped 1958
  Hong Kong patrol craft
  (1953)
  (1956)
  (1956)
  (1957)
  (1956)
  fast attack craft
 Brave Swordsman (1959)
 Brave Borderer (1960)
 Endurance ice patrol ship (converted 1968)
 Tenacity fast patrol craft (1973)
  fast training craft
  (1970)
  (1970)
  (1971)
  large patrol craft
  (1975)
  (1976)
  (1977)
  (1977)
  (1985)
  patrol craft
  - commissioned 1985
  - commissioned 1985
  (1972) offshore patrol craft
  offshore patrol craft
  (1976)
 Guernsey (1977)
 Shetland (1977)
 Orkney (1977)
 Lindisfarne (1978)
 Anglesey (1979)
 Alderney (1979)
  offshore patrol craft
 Leeds Castle (1981)
 Dumbarton Castle (1982)
  patrol and training boat
 Attacker (1983) to Lebanon 1992 as Trablous
 Chaser (1983) to Lebanon 1992 as Jbeil
 Fencer (1983) to Lebanon 1992 as Jounieh
 Hunter (1983) to Lebanon 1992 as Saida
 Striker (1983) to Lebanon 1992 as Arz
 Falkland Island patrol craft
 Protector (1983)
 Guardian (1983)
 Sentinel (1984)
  Hong Kong patrol craft
 Swallow (1984) to Ireland 1988 as Ciara
 Swift (1984) to Ireland 1988 as Orla
 Starling (1984) to Philippines 1997 as Artemio Ricarte
 Peacock (1984) to Philippines 1997 as Emilio Jacinto
 Plover (1984) to Philippines 1997 as Apolinario Mabini

References

Patrol
 
Royal Navy
Royal Navy